Dimitrije "Mita" Tucović (13 May 1881 – November 1914) was a Serbian theorist of the socialist movement, politician, writer and publisher. He was founder of the Serbian Social Democratic Party, with the writings, he participated in many newspapers and magazines: Radničke novine, Život, Borba, Radnički list, Sloboda, Trgovački pomoćnik, Radnik, Die Neue Zeit, Vorwärts, Glas slobode, Radnički kalendar, Majski spisi.

Tucović devoted his entire life to fighting for workers' and human rights, gender equality, universal suffrage, social justice and civil liberties in the Kingdom of Serbia. Some of the ideas that he advocated as a pioneer, today are widely accepted values in contemporary Republic of Serbia.

Life 
Tucović was born 13 May 1881 in the Gostilje village on Mount Zlatibor, near Čajetina.

He was already an adherent to socialist ideas when he came to Belgrade in 1899 to finish high school. He agitated for socialism with Radovan Dragović, who was a big influence on him. In 1901, the Belgrade Workers' Society was renewed and Tucović recreated a socialist group of gymnasium students and became one of the leaders of the Society. He attempted to create modern unions.

In 1902 he organised student demonstrations in the Senate against Nikola Pašić. With Tucović's and Dragović's help, the "Panel for Movement Leadership" was created again and they made the "Central Committee", with a goal of setting the grounds for creating a party. Tucović led the March demonstrations against King Aleksandar Obrenović on 5 March 1903. He was forced to emigrate to Zemun in the neighbouring Austria-Hungary, and afterwards to Vienna.

On 2 August 1903, the Social-Democratic Party was formed, with Tucović and Dragiša Lapčević as one of the leaders. The editor of their newspaper, "Worker's Newspaper" was Tucović. During the Second Congress of a workers union SSDP (1904), Tucović gave a lecture on union organisations. In polemics with the left wing of the party, headed by Dragiša Lapčević, Tucović often adopted a centralist and right-opportunist positions.

In 1906, he graduated from the University of Belgrade's Law School. After coming back from Berlin, he gave up on his doctorate and started spending his time in socialist and labour movement, as a secretary of SSDP.

Tucović was the organizer and leader of the first Balkan Socialist Conference, held in Belgrade from 7-9. January 1910, aimed at creating a Balkan federation.

In 1910, the party established a theory magazine Borba – Tucović was the editor. He participated at the International Socialist Congress in Copenhagen the same year and gave an important speech criticizing the position that Austrian social-democrats took on the national issue, especially the Austro-Hungarian annexation of Bosnia and Herzegovina. In a debate with Karl Renner he pointed out the colonial-enslaving politics of Austro-Hungary and the fact that social-democrats were supporting the government on the issue.

After the outbreak of the Balkan wars 1912, he was mobilized in the Serbian army and participated in the Serbian military campaign in Albania. He sent letters from the front about war crimes against civil population which were regularly published in the Worker's Newspaper. Writing of the massacres of Albanians during the Serbian takeover of Kosovo from Turkey (1912), he stated:

After returning from the Balkan war, he published his influential book Serbia and Albania: A Contribution to the Critique of the Conqueror Policy of the Serbian Bourgeoisie, which analyzes the roots of Serbian-Albanian conflict and consider "among the most important Marxist contributions on the national question in the Balkans".

He died on the frontlines in World War I at Vrače Brdo. He died as a member of Morava division in November 1914 in a Battle of Kolubara against Austro-Hungarian army at Ljig's bank. In 1915, Leon Trotsky wrote about the political impact of his death:

The Slavija Square in Belgrade used to be named after him. He has streets named after him in Skopje, Užice, Belgrade, Kragujevac, and many other cities and towns of former Yugoslavia.

Selected works
 Union Organization (Sindikalne organizacije) 1904.
 Unions and Party (Sindikati i partija) 1904.
 Austria-Hungary in the Balkans (Austro-Ugarska na Balkanu) 1908.
 Labor Law and Social Democracy (Zakon o radnjama i socijalna demokratija) 1908.
 The labor movement in Serbia (Radnički pokret u Srbiji) 1909.
 Balkan Conference (Balkanska konferencija) 1910.
 First Balkan Social Democratic Conference (Prva balkanska socijaldemokratska konferencija) 1910.
 The Albanian question (Albansko pitanje) 1910.
 War and Peace (Rat i mir) 1910.
 Women's liberation (Oslobođenje žene) 1910.
 Tactics and action (Taktika i akcija) 1910.
 Bourgeois and proletarian Serbia (Buržoaska i proleterska Srbija) 1911.
 Marx and Slavs (Marks i Sloveni) 1911.
 Serbia and Albania (Srbija i Arbanija) 1914.

Notes

References
.

External links

 Review of “Serbia and Albania” by Dimitrije Tucovic, (extract of the book)
 Dimitrije Tucovic, Austro-Marxism and the Annexation of Bosnia and Herzegovina: A Letter to Karl Kautsky, February 1909.
 Dimitrije Tucović, Texts on annexation of Bosnia by Austria-Hungary in 1908, in Andreja Živković and Dragan Plavšić (eds), "The Balkan Socialist Tradition and the Balkan Federation 1871-1915", "Revolutionary History", London, 2003.
 Dimitrije Tucović, The First Balkan Social Democratic Conference, March 1910.
 Dimitrije Tucović: Serbien und Albanien: ein kritischer Beitrag zur Unterdrückungspolitik der serbischen Bourgeoisie
 Tucovićevo pismo o zločinima srpske vojske nad Albancima

1881 births
1914 deaths
People from Čajetina
Serbian journalists
Serbian politicians
Serbian people of World War I
Serbian military personnel of World War I
Serbian military personnel killed in World War I
Serbian socialists
University of Belgrade Faculty of Law alumni
Royal Serbian Army soldiers
Socialism in the Kingdom of Serbia
20th-century journalists
Burials at Belgrade New Cemetery